Rodrequis La'Vant Stephens (born June 14, 1966) is a former American football linebacker in the National Football League for the Seattle Seahawks and the Washington Redskins.  He played college football for the Georgia Tech Yellow Jackets.

1966 births
Living people
Players of American football from Atlanta
American football linebackers
Georgia Tech Yellow Jackets football players
Seattle Seahawks players
Washington Redskins players